Radio Pura Sanchar FM is a radio station in Baitadi District, Nepal. It was established on April 13, 2016, running on frequency 97.0 MHz. It broadcasts in far-western Nepal with the slogan "New Communication of New World." The broadcasts run from 5:00 AM to 11:00 PM every day. Some of the most popular programs on the station include Sandesh Samarpan, Filmymazza, and Raftar Shwar.

Radio stations in Nepal
2016 establishments in Nepal